Averell  may refer to:

Surname 
 Adam Averell (1754–1847), Irish primitive Wesleyan clergyman
 B. J. Averell (born 1979), Harvard graduate and reality show contestant
 Bobby Averell (born 1947), Northern Irish footballer
 Jim Averell (1851–1889), fabled Old West homesteader
 John Averell (died 1771), Irish bishop
 Mary Williamson Averell (1851–1932), American philanthropist
 William Averell (1832–1900), U.S. cavalry general in the American Civil War

Given name 
 W. Averell Harriman (1891–1986),  former governor of New York and United States Ambassador to the Soviet Union and Britain
 Averell Spicer (born 1987), American football defensive tackle
 Averell Smith, American political advisor

Fictional character 
 Averell Dalton, the largest one of The Daltons

See also
Averill (disambiguation)
Avril (name)